Jill Irving (born April 4, 1963) is a Canadian Equestrian Team athlete in dressage. She is reigning Pan American Games champion in team dressage, when she won gold in 2019 in Lima. Irving was born in and grew up in Ontario but has resided in Moncton, New Brunswick since her early 20s.

References

1963 births
Living people
Canadian female equestrians
Canadian dressage riders
Equestrians at the 2019 Pan American Games
Pan American Games gold medalists for Canada
Pan American Games medalists in equestrian
Sportspeople from Greater Sudbury
Sportspeople from Moncton
Medalists at the 2019 Pan American Games
20th-century Canadian women
21st-century Canadian women